Group 2 of the 2007 FIFA Women's World Cup was one of four groups of nations competing at the 2007 FIFA Women's World Cup. The group's first round of matches began on September 12 and its last matches were played on September 20. Most matches were played at the Yellow Dragon Stadium in Hangzhou. Norway topped the group, joined in the second round by Australia, the only team Norway failed to beat. Canada surprisingly failed to make the second round.

Standings

Matches
All times are local (UTC+8)

Ghana vs Australia

Norway vs Canada

Canada vs Ghana

Australia vs Norway

Norway vs Ghana

Australia vs Canada

Notes

References 

2007 FIFA Women's World Cup
Ghana at the 2007 FIFA Women's World Cup
Australia at the 2007 FIFA Women's World Cup
Canada at the 2007 FIFA Women's World Cup
Norway at the 2007 FIFA Women's World Cup